Mayaro is a town in the region of Mayaro–Rio Claro on the island of Trinidad in Trinidad and Tobago.

See also
 List of cities and towns in Trinidad and Tobago
 Rio Claro, Trinidad and Tobago

References

Populated places in Trinidad and Tobago